Furiosa is an upcoming Australian post-apocalyptic action adventure film directed and co-written by George Miller and stars Anya Taylor-Joy as the titular character Imperator Furiosa. It serves as both a spin-off and a prequel to Mad Max: Fury Road (2015). Screenwriter Nico Lathouris, film editor Margaret Sixel, costume designer Jenny Beavan, and composer Junkie XL also return from Fury Road. It will be the fifth film in the Mad Max franchise and is said to be focusing on the origins of Furiosa.

Premise 
As the world falls, young Furiosa is snatched from the Green Place of Many Mothers and falls into the hands of a great Biker Horde led by the Warlord Dementus. Sweeping through the Wasteland they come across the Citadel presided over by Immortan Joe. While the two Tyrants war for dominance, Furiosa must survive many trials as she puts together the means to find her way home.

Cast
 Anya Taylor-Joy as Imperator Furiosa
 Chris Hemsworth
 Tom Burke
 Nathan Jones as Rictus Erectus
 Angus Sampson as The Organic Mechanic
 Quaden Bayles
 Daniel Webber as War Boy
 Lachy Hulme

Production

In March 2020, it was reported Miller was conducting casting auditions for the titular role via Skype, with Taylor-Joy in the mix. In October, the film was announced to be in advanced development, with Taylor-Joy confirmed to be playing the title role, and Chris Hemsworth and Yahya Abdul-Mateen II cast to co-star. Multiple Fury Road crew members were announced to be returning for the film, including film editor Margaret Sixel, production designer Colin Gibson, sound mixer Ben Osmo, and makeup designer Lesley Vanderwalt. In February 2021, composer Junkie XL, who previously scored Fury Road, confirmed he would return for Furiosa. Jenny Beavan would also return to work on the costume design. Miller chose Taylor-Joy for the titular role after seeing her performance in an early cut of the film Last Night in Soho and for her audition he assigned her the "Mad as Hell" monologue from Sidney Lumet's Network. She was paid $1.8 million for her involvement. Due to a scheduling conflict, Abdul-Mateen II exited the project in November, with Tom Burke cast to replace him. In January 2022, it was reported that Simon Duggan would be serving as cinematographer. In June 2022, it was reported Nathan Jones and Angus Sampson were set to reprise their roles from Fury Road. In August, Quaden Bayles, who worked on Miller's Three Thousand Years of Longing after Bayles went viral for a video about his mistreatment at school, was announced to be appearing in Furiosa, in a small role.

The film was awarded a AU$175 million filming incentive, and spent a total of US$233 million (AU$343.2 million) in Australia, the most-ever for a film production in the country. After multiple different dates were reported for the start of filming, Deadline confirmed in a May 2022 interview with Miller that second unit filming was currently underway in Australia in advance of principal photography. In May 2022, second unit filming moved to Hay with more scheduled to take place in Silverton. Principal photography began on 1 June 2022, in Australia, and was expected to wrap by September. Filming officially wrapped on 28 October 2022.

Release
The film is due for release on 24 May 2024. It was originally scheduled to be released on 23 June 2023.

References

External links
 

2024 films
2024 action films
2020s action adventure films
2020s English-language films
Australian action adventure films
Australian post-apocalyptic films
Film spin-offs
Films directed by George Miller
Films produced by George Miller
Films produced by Doug Mitchell
Films scored by Junkie XL
Films shot in New South Wales
Mad Max films
Upcoming English-language films
Upcoming prequel films
Village Roadshow Pictures films
Warner Bros. films
American prequel films
Australian prequel films